Wuhu station can refer to:
Wuhu railway station, a railway station in Wuhu, China
Wuhu station (Wuhan Metro), a metro station in Wuhan, China